Tsvetanka Ilieva (born 1 March 1963) is a retired Bulgarian sprinter who specialized in the 400 metres.

She finished eighth in the 4 x 400 metres relay at the 1983 World Championships, with teammates Rositsa Stamenova, Pepa Pavlova and Yuliana Marinova.

Her personal best time was 51.89 seconds, achieved in August 1987 in Stara Zagora.

References

1963 births
Living people
Athletes (track and field) at the 1988 Summer Olympics
Bulgarian female sprinters
Olympic athletes of Bulgaria
Olympic female sprinters
21st-century Bulgarian women
20th-century Bulgarian women